Obiliq is a town and municipality in Kosovo. According to the Kosovo Agency of Statistics (KAS) estimate from the 2011 census, there were 21,549 people residing in Obiliq Municipality, with Kosovo Albanians constituting the majority of the population.

Name 

Prior to the Balkan Wars, the settlement was known as Globoderica.

Following the conflict, the settlement was incorporated into Serbia and renamed Obilić as part of the Serbianisation efforts of the early twentieth century when inhabited places within Kosovo were named after heroes from Serbian epic poetry. The placename Obilić refers to the Serbian national hero Miloš Obilić who killed the Ottoman Sultan Murad I at the Battle of Kosovo (1389).

In Albanian, the town is known as Obiliq (a transliteration of the Serbian name), while an alternative name (used by Albanians ) was coined by the Albanological Institute, Kastriot, after Albanian national hero George Kastrioti Skanderbeg (1405–1468).

Economy 

There are three coal mines operating on the territory of Obiliq: Belaćevac, Miraš and Sibovc.

Demography 

According to the 2011 census, the municipality had a population of 21,548 inhabitants. Based on the population estimates from the Kosovo Agency of Statistics in 2016, the municipality has 19,440 inhabitants.

The ethnic composition of the town of Obilić:

Notes

References

External links 

Municipality of ObiliqOfficial Website

 
Obiliq
Obiliq
1989 establishments in Europe
Populated places established in 1989
Populated places in Pristina District